Chionogenes is a genus of moths of the family Yponomeutidae. It is found in Australia.

Species
Chionogenes drosochlora - Meyrick, 1907 
Chionogenes isanema - Meyrick, 1907 
Chionogenes trimetra - Meyrick, 1913 

Yponomeutidae